Kashmir Avengers FC (abbreviated as KAFC) is an Indian professional football club based in Srinagar Jammu and Kashmir, that competes in the JKFA Professional League. It is an institutional club and are owned by Arshed Ahmed Zargar. The U-18 team plays in NIFF Youth Football League. The senior team also participated in the first edition of Real Kashmir Cup.

Kit manufacturers and shirt sponsors

Current squad

Huzaif ahmad zargar

Current technical staff

Honours

Cup 
All India Mahatma Ghandhi Memorial Football Cup
Winners (1): 2021

References 

Football clubs in Jammu and Kashmir